Laurie R. King (born September 19, 1952) is an American author best known for her detective fiction.

Life and career

Born in Oakland, California, King earned a degree in comparative religion from the University of California, Santa Cruz in 1977 and a masters in theology from the Graduate Theological Union in 1984, where her thesis was on "Feminine Aspects of Yahweh". She later received an honorary doctorate from the Church Divinity School of the Pacific.

Among King's books are the Mary Russell series of historical mysteries, featuring Sherlock Holmes as her mentor and later partner, and a series featuring Kate Martinelli, a lesbian police officer in San Francisco, California. Using the pseudonym "Leigh Richards", she has published a science fiction novel, Califia's Daughters (2004). Across these genres, she explores several humanist themes, including  the effects of war on soldiers as they attempt to find their place when returning home. This is seen in several of the Mary Russell novels and has been described in a comparison of the detectives in Keeping Watch (2003) and Touchstone (2007).
 
She lives in Watsonville, California, in the hills above Monterey Bay, southeast of Santa Cruz, California. From 1977 until his death in early 2009, she was married to the historian Noel Quinton King. They are the parents of two children.

Awards
King's first book, A Grave Talent (1993), received the 1994 Edgar Award for Best First Novel and a 1995 John Creasey Memorial Award. This was followed by the 1996 Nero Award, for A Monstrous Regiment of Women, the 2002 Macavity Award for Best Novel, for Folly, the 2007 Lambda Award for Best Lesbian Mystery, for The Art of Detection, and the 2015 Agatha Award for Best Historical Novel, for Dreaming Spies.  She has also been nominated for two Anthonys, a Barry, two additional Edgars, another Macavity, an Orange Prize, and four RT Reviewers' Choice Awards. In 2022, she won the Edgar Award's 'Grand Master' for her work.

She was inducted into membership of The Baker Street Irregulars in 2010.

Works

Kate Martinelli mysteries
A Grave Talent (1993) 
To Play the Fool (1995) 
With Child (1996) 
Night Work (2000) 
The Art of Detection (2006)  (Lambda Literary Award 2006)
Beginnings (2019)

Mary Russell and Sherlock Holmes mysteries
The Beekeeper's Apprentice (1994) 
A Monstrous Regiment of Women (1995) 
A Letter of Mary (1997) 
The Moor (1998) 
O Jerusalem (1999)   (although written fifth in sequence, the events in this book take place during the latter part of those described in The Beekeeper's Apprentice)
Justice Hall (2002) 
The Game (2004) 
Locked Rooms (2005) 
The Language of Bees (2009) 
The God of the Hive (2010) 
Beekeeping for Beginners (an ebook novella) (2011)  (This short story describes the early events of The Beekeeper's Apprentice from the point of view of Sherlock Holmes. The novella is included in Garment of Shadows .)
Pirate King (2011) 
Garment of Shadows (2012) 
Dreaming Spies (2015)  (although written thirteenth in sequence, the events in this book take place between those described in The Game and Locked Rooms)
The Marriage of Mary Russell (March 15, 2016) 
The Murder of Mary Russell (April 5, 2016) 
Mary Russell's War And Other Stories of Suspense (2016) 
Island of the Mad (2018) 
 Riviera Gold (2020)  
 Castle Shade (2021)

Harris Stuyvesant and Bennett Grey series
(Historical novels of suspense, featuring FBI agent Harris Stuyvesant and injured British soldier Bennett Grey)
Touchstone (2007) 
The Bones of Paris (2013)

Non-series books
A Darker Place [UK title: The Birth of a New Moon] (1999) 
Folly (2001) 
Keeping Watch (2003) 
Califia's Daughters (as Leigh Richards) (2004) - science fiction. 
Lockdown (2017) 
Back to the Garden (2022) ISBN 978-0-593-49656-5

Further reading
Emrys, A. B. "Under Cover of Wartime: Disguised Murder in Works by Rennie Airth, Laurie R. King, Martha Grimes, and Anthony Horowitz." CLUES:  A Journal of Detection 25.4 (Summer 2007):
53-63.

References

External links
 
 Ex Libris Archives: Laurie R. King

1952 births
Living people
20th-century American novelists
20th-century American women writers
21st-century American novelists
21st-century American women writers
Agatha Award winners
American mystery writers
American women novelists
Edgar Award winners
Lambda Literary Award winners
Macavity Award winners
Nero Award winners
Writers of historical mysteries
Writers from Santa Cruz, California
Place of birth missing (living people)
Women mystery writers
21st-century pseudonymous writers
Pseudonymous women writers